Sir Thomas Samwell, 1st Baronet (c. 1654 – 23 February 1694) was a Member of Parliament for Northamptonshire from 1689 to 1690 and for Northampton from 1690 to 1694. His great-grandfather was Sir William Samwell (1559–1628), Auditor of the Exchequer to Queen Elizabeth I of England.

Sources

1650s births
1694 deaths
Baronets in the Baronetage of England
English MPs 1689–1690
English MPs 1690–1695
People from Upton, Northamptonshire